Lauren Reynolds (born 25 June 1991) is an Australian cyclist. She represented Australia in the individual BMX event at the 2012 Summer Olympics.

Personal
Nicknamed Loza, Reynolds was born on 25 June 1991 in Bunbury, Western Australia. She attended Leschenault Catholic Primary School before going to Bunbury Catholic College for high school. Beyond cycling, she is also a surfer and basketball player. Lauren quit competitive basketball in 2003.  , she lives in Perth, Western Australia.

Cycling
Reynolds is a BMX cyclist, competing in the individual event. She started riding a BMX bike by the time she was seven years old. As a child, she did BMX riding in Bunbury, doing stunts such as launching herself off the Bunbury jetty and into the river.

Her primary training base is on the Gold Coast of Queensland. She was coached by Tony Hancox from 2006 to 2008. Wade Bootes became her coach in 2009. She is a member of the Bunbury BMX Club. She has a cycling scholarship with the Western Australian Institute of Sport and Queensland Academy of Sport.

Reynolds finished 2nd at the 2011 Australian Championships in Cairns, Australia. She finished 11th at the 2011 BMX World Championships in Copenhagen, Denmark. She finished 3rd at the 2011 BMX Supercross #3 in London, Great Britain.

Reynolds finished 12th at the 2012 BMX World Championships in Birmingham, Great Britain. She finished 15th at the 2012 BMX Supercross #3 in Papendal, The Netherlands. She finished 20th at the 2012 BMX Supercross #2 in Randaberg, Norway. She finished 2nd at the 2012 Australian BMX Championships in Mt Gambier, Australia.

Reynolds was selected to represent Australia in the individual BMX competition at the 2012 Summer Olympics. She was named to the squad on her twenty-first birthday. She was one of five Australian BMX riders selected to represent the country at the 2012 Games. 2012 were her debut Games. There she was left on the eighth place in her semifinal. Her overall standing was fifteenth.

In the 2020 Tokyo Olympics, she made the final, where she came in fifth place.

References

External links
 
 
 
 

1991 births
Living people
BMX riders
Australian female cyclists
Olympic cyclists of Australia
Cyclists at the 2012 Summer Olympics
Cyclists at the 2016 Summer Olympics
Cyclists at the 2020 Summer Olympics
Sportswomen from Western Australia
People from Bunbury, Western Australia